Cercidiphyllum magnificum, known as the large-leaf katsura or magnificent katsura tree, is a species of flowering tree in the family Cercidiphyllaceae native to Honshu, Japan. It is sometimes called caramel tree for the light, sweet smell it emits during leaf fall, sometimes compared to cotton candy (candyfloss) or "freshly baked biscuits and bread". It is grown as an ornamental tree for its heart shaped leaves that in autumn turn a mixture of bright yellow, pink and orange-red.

Description
Cercidiphyllum magnificum is a small deciduous tree, growing to no more than 10 m in height and pyramidal to broadly conical in shape. The tree has a smooth bark. The twigs bear leaves that are dimorphic with both short and long shoots. The short shoots bear large cordate (heart-shape) or reniform (kidney shaped) leaves with palmate venation and crenate margins, while the long shoots have leaves that are elliptic to broadly ovate with entire or finely serrate margins.

The species is dioecious, having separate male and female trees, with small inconspicuous flowers appearing early in spring that are wind pollinated. The flowers lack petals, the male being reddish and the female greenish. The pods contain many small flattened seeds that are winged at both ends.

It is similar to Cercidiphyllum japonicum, but can be distinguished by a combination of the following characteristics: C. magnificum is a smaller tree that typically has only a single main trunk (vs. large, canopy-forming, with multiple trunks); the leaves are more deeply crenated; the follicles are partially dehiscent, with slightly recurved tips (vs. follicles fully dehiscing and strongly recurving tips); grows at a higher elevation, rarely co-occurring with C. japonicum.

Taxonomy
Cercidiphyllum magnificum is, along with C. japonicum, one of only two members of the genus Cercidiphyllum and family Cercidiphyllaceae. It was first described as a variety, C. japonicum var. magnificum, in 1919 by Japanese botanist Takenoshin Nakai, then separated into a different species the following year in his Catalogus seminum et sporarum Hortus Botanicus Universitatis Imperialis Tokyoensis. The type locality is from Honshu, Japan in the Ashio Mountains (Mount Nikkō-Shirane and Mount Konsei.

Distribution and habitat
Cercidiphyllum magnificum is endemic to the central, forested mountainous areas of Honshu.

Uses
The katsura wood is soft and light and used for cabinetry and paneling.

References

Saxifragales
Trees of Japan
Ornamental trees
Plants described in 1919